Radu Barbu  (born 29 August 1989) is a Romanian footballer who is under contract with Voința Vișani.

References

External links
 
 

1989 births
Living people
Romanian footballers
Association football defenders
Liga I players
FC U Craiova 1948 players
FC Petrolul Ploiești players
CS Mioveni players
FC Brașov (1936) players
Liga II players
CS Turnu Severin players
LPS HD Clinceni players
Sportspeople from Craiova